Thérèse-Lucy de Dillon née de Rothe (1751 – September 1782), was a French countess and courtier, lady-in-waiting to queen Marie Antoinette of France in 1780–82. She belonged to the intimate circle of friends of the queen and was for a while known as one of her favorites.

Life
She was the maternal niece of the Archbishop of Narbonne, Arthur Richard Dillon, and married her second cousin count Arthur Dillon (1750–1794) in 1768, and became the mother of Henriette-Lucy, Marquise de La Tour du Pin Gouvernet. 

Dillon was described as a beauty and became one of the favorite companions of Marie Antoinette and one of the close confidants she invited to her petit cabinets. To keep Dillon near her, the queen appointed her dame du palais surnuméraire in 1780, a step which created great jealousy at court, and for a while, she was reportedly always in the queen's presence. Like the other favorite Princesse de Lamballe, who was regarded to be affiliated with Palais Royal, Dillon was regarded to be a pawn of her uncle the Archbishop de Narbonne, to whom she was economically dependent. 
She had a relationship with Henri Louis, Prince of Guéméné and was also an intimate friend of her lover's spouse Victoire de Rohan, who were also a personal friend of the queen, and Abbé de Vermond reportedly reproached Marie Antoinette from keeping company with women of ill repute like Dillon and Guéméné.

Dillon was eventually taken ill in tuberculosis, which caused her death in 1782. During her illness, the queen reportedly visited her on her sick bed and daily sent for news of her friend's illness, and were reportedly devastated upon her death. However, only one day after the death of Dillon, Marie Antoinette had seemingly recovered from her sorrow and expressed a wish to go to the theater. Louise-Charlotte de Duras, who was sent to advise her against it because she was allegedly the lady-in-waiting the queen respected the most, told her that it would be better if she visited the Opera, as the way to the theater was passing near the Saint Sulpice, and she would in that case risk to run in to the funeral procession of Madame Dillon on her way. This story was widely spread around, and contributed to the growing bad publicity around Marie Antoinette, who was viewed only to have mourned a close friend for no more than a day.

References 

French ladies-in-waiting
1751 births
1782 deaths
French royal favourites
Household of Marie Antoinette